List of World Cup red cards may refer to:
List of FIFA World Cup red cards
List of Rugby World Cup red cards